Carlos De Antonis is an Argentine opera singer.

Early life
Carlos De Antonis was born in Argentina in Tandil the province of Buenos Aires. He started studying music in Tandil at an early age with Andres Risso, Bernardo Moroder, and Sofia Galicia. He moved to Buenos Aires and completed his studies with Oscar Ruiz and Natalia Biffis.

Career

Early career
He joined the chorus of important theaters in South America in the early nineties: Teatro Colón in Buenos Aires, Teatro Argentino in La Plata, and Teatro Avenida. In the same period he debuted in the musical Dracula, which in 1994 went on a tour and became well known in much of Latin America (Chile, Brazil, Uruguay, Paraguay, and Argentina). In 1993 he played a leading role in the first international version of The Hunchback of Notre Dame, which was presented at the Luna Park Stadium in Buenos Aires. In 1995 he once again played Quasimodo in the Argentine version of the same musical by Cibrian-Mahler. The following year he debuted in the leading part in the musical La Fiesta del Año in Uruguay. In 1997 he starred in Sueños by José Cibrian Campoy and La Mitad de Algo by Enrique Morales. In 1998 in The Zarzuela by Luisa Fernanda. At the same time he toured Argentina and carried out more than 150 performances of his own conception.

European crossover

In 2000, he moved to Germany where he was selected as a tenor for the Concert Forum Berlin. He performed in 43 cities in Germany in opera houses (Hamburg, Frankfurt, Berlin, Cologne, Düsseldorf, Munich). He also performed as a tenor in the closing of World Class Polo 2000 and the Grand Ball in Berlin (Adlon Hotel). In 2001, with the Dutch company Concert Music, he performed in the Netherlands, Germany, and Belgium in Drei Jungen Tenoren. In 2002 he worked with the Micheal Tietz Company and toured all over Germany in the Enrico Caruso Gala and with the Music Concert Company in ‘O Sole Mio during the festival of Der Tenore. In the summer of the same year he started performing his one-man Carlos De Antonis Concert in Sardinia, Italy. In 2003, he performed for the first time in the musical Sogno d'Oriente and in the show Gala Lirica. He also performed numerous concerts in Germany, France, Italy, Spain, and Mexico. In 2004,with Gala Lirica and other concert companies he toured Argentina, Uruguay, Chile, and Miami.  

In 2005, after playing Alfredo in La Traviata with four performances in La Plata, he played the Duke of Mantua in Rigoletto, followed by Fenton in Falstaff, and Elisir d'Amore in Germany.

In 2006, he debuted at the G. Verdi Conservatory in Milan and played the roles of Count Almaviva in the Barber of Seville, Rinuccio in Gianni Schicchi, Alfredo in La Traviata, and Rodolfo in La Bohème.  

He performed other concerts and recitals in Germany, Barcelona, Uruguay, Sardinia, Argentina, Canada, South Africa, Italy and Denmark. He also did new production with the company Giovane Balletto Italiano directed by Matteo Bittante.    
In March 2006, he performed at the Teatro Rossetti in Trieste in the show Pomeriggi Musicali al Rossetti, organized by Associazione Internazionale Dell'Operetta Friuli Venezia Giulia. 

In April, in Barcelona he played Edgardo in Lucia di Lammermoor with Natasha Tupin and Fernando Alvarez while Andrea Alvarez is the conductor.

Current life
The end of 2006 marked the beginning of De Antonis’ representation by SPS Records in Los Angeles, California.  

In early 2007, he began recording his debut album Del Cuore  with the help of producer, Kim Scharnberg. The album was recorded at  Capitol Records in Los Angeles and Glendwood Place Studios in Burbank both in California.

On March 24, 2007, De Antonis performed at Celebrity Fight Night XIII in Phoenix, AZ.

Del Cuore

De Antonis' debut solo album was titled Del Cuore, which means "from the heart" in Italian.

Track listing 
Del Cuore's eleven songs represent a variety of musical genres including opera, pop, tango, and hymnal. In addition to the assortment of musical styles, the album is also sung in multiple languages including Spanish, Italian, English, Napoletan and Latin. The track list of songs with language and style are as follows:

1. "O Sole Mio"
2. "Todo Me Recuerda a Ti"
3. "This is the Moment"
4. "Nostalgias"
5. "Nessun Dorma"
6. "Two Different Worlds"
7. "Panis Angelicus"
8. "Non Ti Scordar Di Me" 
9. "Io Penso a Te"
10. "Mattinata/Oh What a Beautiful Morning"
11. "One Rose"

Duet

Track 6 on the album is a duet titled "Two Different Worlds" which De Antonis performs with the Broadway performer and recording artist Linda Eder.

Recording studios
The album was recorded at two separate recording studios. Parts of Del Cuore, including the forty-six-piece orchestra and 30-person choir, were recorded at Capitol Studios in Los Angeles, California. The remainder of the album was recorded at Glenwood Place Studios in Burbank, CA.

References

20th-century Argentine male opera singers
21st-century Argentine male opera singers
Opera crossover singers
People from Tandil
Living people
Year of birth missing (living people)